Monsters in the Closet is the fourth studio album by American rock band Mayday Parade. Recorded between March and June 2013, the album was produced by Zack Odom and Kenneth Mount. It was released in October 2013 by Fearless and sold 30,000 copies in its first week.

Background and production
After releasing their third album, Mayday Parade (2011), through major label ILG, Mayday Parade would re-sign with independent label Fearless in January 2013. Drummer Jake Bundrick explained that the label "has always been family to us and we're really happy to have that again.  Exciting times!" Discussing new material, bassist Jeremy Lenzo described the songs as "ha[ving] a little bit of everything". "Ghosts", according to Lenzo, deals with "your inner demons, and it portrays that in a literal sense by referring to them as ghosts and how they are always with you."

Also in January, the band started recording. On March 23, the band posted a studio update. On April 4, the band posted another studio video, this time with Lenzo discussing his bass parts. Between April 11 and May 12, the band went on the Spring Fever Tour supporting All Time Low and Pierce the Veil. On June 27, it was announced that recording had finished.
On July 11, the band released a third studio update. A week later, the band posted a fourth studio update video.

Release
On July 29, 2013 Monsters in the Closet was announced for release, and the cover art was revealed. On August 23, the track listing was revealed. "Ghosts" was released as a single on August 27. "Girls" was released as a single on September 17. On September 18, a lyric video was released for "Girls". An album preview was posted via Buzznet on October 1. On October 7, Monsters in the Closet was made available for streaming via Billboard, and was released through Fearless, a day later. The album was released on vinyl the same day. On October 14, a lyric video was released for "12 Through 15". In October and November, the band headlined the Glamour Kills tour with support from Man Overboard, Cartel, and Stages & Stereos.

On November 14, a music video was released for "Ghosts" via Entertainment Tonight. The video was directed by Brant Kantor. The video takes place in a haunted bed and breakfast. Zach Seemayer of Entertainment Tonight noted that the video includes "elements of horror, fantasy and melodrama, and turning them on their head in a funny, rollicking pop-punk video". He also mentioned that the video had "great production value and innovative concepts." In January and February, the band went on a tour of the UK and Europe, titled Monsters Overseas. They were supported by Man Overboard, Divided by Friday and Decade. This was followed by a tour of South Asia in March. On April 28, a music video was released for "Hold Onto Me". The video was directed by Dan Centrone.

In late April and May, the band went on the So Devastating, It's Unnatural tour with support from We Are the in Crowd, Transit and Divided by Friday. On May 26, "Worth a Thousand Words" was made available for streaming through PureVolume, "Stuck in Remission" was made available for streaming through PropertyofZack, and "Hear the Sound" was made available for streaming through AbsolutePunk. A deluxe edition of the album was released on May 27 featuring the aforementioned three tracks. Lenzo explained that since the group were "so happy" with the reception for the album, they "decided to [...] [include] a few songs that didn't make it on the [original] release so that you could hear everything we were working on, and see other directions the album could have gone." The band went on the 2014 edition of Warped Tour. In October and November, the band went on the Honeymoon Tour with support from Tonight Alive, Major League and PVRIS.

Reception

Monsters in the Closet debuted at number 10 on the Billboard 200 chart, selling 30,000 copies and becoming the band's best debut week. The album also charted at number 4 on Alternative Albums, number 10 on Digital Albums, number 2 on Independent Albums, and number 4 on the Rock Albums charts in the U.S. "Ghosts" charted at number 16 on the UK Independent Singles Breakers Chart, number 35 on the UK Rock & Metal Singles Chart, and number 46 on the Rock Songs chart in the U.S.

Track listing

Personnel
Personnel per digital booklet.

Mayday Parade
 Jake Bundrick – drums, vocals
 Jeremy Lenzo – bass guitar, vocals
 Derek Sanders – lead vocals, keyboard
 Alex Garcia – lead guitar
 Brooks Betts – rhythm guitar
Additional musicians
 Tiffany Houghton – additional vocals
 Zack Odom – string arrangement, viola
 Rami Jaffee – Hammond B3 organ
 Seth Mann – violin
 Mary Beth Bryant – cello
 Mike Fogleman – professional gang vocals

Production
 Zack Odom, Kenneth Mount – producers, recording
 Darrick Atwater – assistant for drum tracking
 Daniel Korneff – mixing
 Brad Blackwood – mastering

Chart performance

References
 Footnotes

 Citations

External links

Monsters in the Closet (deluxe edition) at YouTube (streamed copy where licensed)

Mayday Parade albums
2013 albums
Fearless Records albums